Rebordãos is a civil parish in the municipality of Bragança, Portugal. The population in 2011 was 546, in an area of 26.29 km².

References

Parishes of Bragança, Portugal